Ayfer is a Turkish given name for females. People named Ayfer include:

 Ayfer Topluoğlu (born 1977), Turkish footballer and manager
 Ayfer Tunç (born 1964), Turkish writer
 Ayfer Yılmaz (born 1956), Turkish civil servant, politician and former government minister

Turkish feminine given names